One and Done is a live EP by the American hard rock band Halestorm. It was released on April 28, 2006 through Atlantic Records. The EP is the band's first release on a major record label and also the first release in its current line-up. It's the band's fourth overall EP.

Track list
All songs written by Halestorm.

Personnel
 Lzzy Hale - Lead Vocals, Rhythm and Lead Guitar, Keyboard
 Arejay Hale - Drums, Percussion, Backing Vocals
 Joe Hottinger - Lead Guitar, Backing Vocals
 Josh Smith - Bass guitar, Backing Vocals

References

2006 EPs
Atlantic Records EPs